Chrysophyllum marginatum is a tree in the family Sapotaceae, native to South America.

Description
It is a suitable species for reforestation.

Distribution and habitat
Chrysophyllum marginatum is native to Argentina, Bolivia, Brazil, Paraguay and Uruguay. Its habitat is in woodlands near rivers or in mountainous areas.

References

marginatum
Flora of Northeast Argentina
Flora of Northwest Argentina
Flora of Bolivia
Flora of Brazil
Flora of Paraguay
Flora of Uruguay
Plants described in 1834